In-Laws is an American sitcom television series created by Mark Reisman, that aired on NBC from September 24, 2002 to January 14, 2003. The series starred Bonnie Somerville, Jean Smart, Elon Gold, and Dennis Farina.

Plot
The protagonist has trouble with his fiancé's in-laws. Hijinks ensue.

Cast
Dennis Farina as Victor Pellet
Elon Gold as Matt Landis
Bonnie Somerville as Alex Pellet Landis
Jean Smart as Marlene Pellet

Episodes

References

External links
 

NBC original programming
English-language television shows
2000s American sitcoms
2002 American television series debuts
2003 American television series endings
Television series about families
Television series about marriage
Television series by CBS Studios
Television series by Universal Television